The Royal Naval School of Flight Deck Operations is the Fleet Air Arm's training establishment for aircraft handling.

History
It was known as the School of Aircraft Handling until November 1995, when the officer unit in Dorset joined. The whole site was at Gosport until 1957, and moved again
in November 1959 to Cornwall. It included Naval Air Command Fire School.

The current site officially opened in October 1995.

Training
The site trains around 1500 sailors per year. Training includes a 15 week course for aircraft handlers (AH) and flight deck officers.

 Air 153, for driving naval fire service (CFR) vehicles
 Air 199, Instruction on the Carriage of Dangerous Goods
 Air 302, flight safety
 NVQ Level 2 in Providing Aviation Operations on the Ground (City and Guilds and EAL)

Structure
A new Flight Deck Training Simulator was built in November 2015 by Systems Engineering and Assessment (SEA) of Frome, costing £500,000. It has Kinect motion sensing.

Four F-35 models were built in June 2017 by Gateguards Ltd of Cornwall.

The site has a 600ft practice flight deck.

See also
 School of Air Operations Control
 1700 Naval Air Squadron
 :Category:Aircraft carrier fires

References

External links
 Recent history

Education in Cornwall
Education in Hampshire
Fire and rescue in the United Kingdom
Firefighting academies
Gosport
Military firefighting
Naval aviation education
Naval aviation units and formations of the United Kingdom
Training establishments of the Royal Navy